Chris Hill (born c. 1950) is an American college athletics administrator and former basketball player and coach. He was  the athletic director at the University of Utah from 1987 to 2018. His responsibilities included overseeing the athletic department and supervising all the coaches. During his thirty-one years in his position, he has hired several coaches, secured funding for facilities upgrades, and negotiated the University of Utah's entrance into the Pac-12 Conference.

Coaches hired
During Hill's tenure, the Utah Utes have shown success in several different sports. He has been responsible for hiring Rick Majerus in college basketball and Ron McBride, Urban Meyer, and Kyle Whittingham in college football. From 2004–2009, he served on the NCAA Division I Men's Basketball Committee, which decides which teams are accepted into the NCAA Men's Division I Basketball Championship tournament held each March.

A March 2013 story appearing Yahoo! Sports suggested that Hill ignored complaints from students and parents about abusive behavior from Greg Winslow, a swimming coach at Utah from 2007 to 2013.

Facilities improvements
Hill has helped improve the athletics facilities at Utah. In 1998, the school remodeled Rice-Eccles Stadium in preparation for the 2002 Winter Olympics, which held the Opening and Closing Ceremonies at the stadium. In addition, the following facilities have been improved or built during his tenure: the George S. Eccles Tennis Center, Dee Glen Smith Athletics Center, and the McCarthey Practice Fields.

Pac-12 Conference
Hill and University of Utah president Michael K. Young negotiated with the Pacific-10 Conference (Pac-10) to make Utah a member. Utah joined the Pac-10 for the 2011–12 academic year. The University of Colorado at Boulder also joined the Pac-10 in 2011, when the conference was renamed as the Pac-12 Conference (Pac-12).

References

External links
 Utah profile

Year of birth missing (living people)
Living people
High school basketball coaches in the United States
Rutgers Scarlet Knights men's basketball players
Utah Utes athletic directors
Utah Utes men's basketball coaches
University of Utah alumni
University of Utah faculty
American men's basketball players